Cheryle Peel (born 12 February 1976) is a British judoka. She competed in the women's lightweight event at the 2000 Summer Olympics. She is a three times champion of Great Britain, winning the lightweight division at the British Judo Championships in 1993 and 1994 and the light-middleweight title in 1995.

References

1976 births
Living people
British female judoka
Olympic judoka of Great Britain
Judoka at the 2000 Summer Olympics
Place of birth missing (living people)